The Female, released in the United Kingdom as A Woman Like Satan, is a 1959 French-Italian drama film directed by Julien Duvivier. It is the fourth film adaptation of the novel La Femme et le pantin by Pierre Louÿs.

Plot
Mateo Diaz is a wealthy gentleman who loves and respects his wife but no longer finds her attractive because she is paralysed. He pursues Eva Marchand but she does not respond to his advances.

Cast
 Brigitte Bardot – Éva Marchand
 António Vilar – Don Mateo Diaz
 Lila Kedrova – Manuela
 Daniel Ivernel – Berthier
 Darío Moreno – Arbadajian
 Jacques Mauclair – Stanislas Marchand
 Jess Hahn – Sidney

Production
Brigitte Bardot wrote in her autobiography that although the crew would call director Julien Duvivier "Dudu," the set was not harmonious. She also described the difficulty of filming in the heat of Seville during the Seville Fair.

See also
 The Woman and the Puppet (1920)
 The Woman and the Puppet (1929)
 The Devil Is a Woman (1935)
 That Obscure Object of Desire (1977)

References

External links
 
 

1959 films
1959 drama films
Films directed by Julien Duvivier
Films shot in Spain
1950s French-language films
Films with screenplays by Jean Aurenche
French drama films
Italian drama films
Films based on works by Pierre Louÿs
1950s Italian films
1950s French films